Esther Ann Hershey [Reeser] (January 5, 1928 – January 14, 2014) was an American outfielder who played briefly for the Springfield Sallies of the All-American Girls Professional Baseball League in 1948. Esther played under her maiden name, and she was nicknamed Zan.

She was born in Nine Points, Pennsylvania and died in Honey Brook, Pennsylvania.

References

1928 births
2014 deaths
All-American Girls Professional Baseball League players
Springfield Sallies players
Baseball players from Pennsylvania
21st-century American women